Graham Filler (born  1983) is a Republican member of the Michigan House of Representatives.

Filler was named an assistant attorney general in 2011. Filler is a member of the Farm Bureau of Michigan, the National Rifle Association, and Right to Life of Clinton County.

References

External links 
 Graham Filler at gophouse.org
 Graham Filler at ballotpedia.org
 Graham Filler at votesmart.org

Living people
Miami University alumni
Republican Party members of the Michigan House of Representatives
American anti-abortion activists
21st-century American politicians
Year of birth missing (living people)
1980s births
University of Detroit Mercy alumni